The KhAB-250 is the provisional naming of an aerial bomb developed by the Soviet Air Force to deliver the chemical weapon sarin.

The bomb uses a burst charge to detonate on impact with the ground.

The KhAB-250 was displayed at Shikani Test and Proving Grounds in 1986 as a component of the then-current Soviet chemical arsenal. Contemporary analysts noted that it appeared relatively unsophisticated compared to Soviet conventional munitions of the same time frame.

The bomb was removed from service as a result of the Chemical Weapons Convention in the early 1990s.

See also 
KhAB-500
KAB-250

References 

Cold War aerial bombs of the Soviet Union
Aerial bombs of Russia
Chemical weapons